Komarovka is a rural locality (a selo) in Nikolo-Komarovsky Selsoviet, Kamyzyaksky District, Astrakhan Oblast, Russia. The population was 354 as of 2010. There are 4 streets.

Geography 
Komarovka is located 36 km northwest of Kamyzyak (the district's administrative centre) by road. Nikolskoye is the nearest rural locality.

References 

Rural localities in Kamyzyaksky District